Eugène Hanck (1 February 1928 – 13 November 2013) was a Luxembourgian sprint canoeist born in Attert, Belgium, who competed in the early 1950s. He finished 18th in the K-2 10000 m event at the 1952 Summer Olympics in Helsinki. In 2008, he was promoted to the rank of Chevalier in the Order of Merit of the Grand Duchy of Luxembourg.

References

1928 births
2013 deaths
People from Attert
Sportspeople from Luxembourg (Belgium)
Canoeists at the 1952 Summer Olympics
Luxembourgian male canoeists
Olympic canoeists of Luxembourg
Knights of the Order of Merit of the Grand Duchy of Luxembourg